Debussy (foaled 26 February 2006) is an Irish Thoroughbred racehorse who won the Arlington Million in 2010. Debussy was trained by John Gosden.

References

2006 racehorse births
Thoroughbred family 6-b
Racehorses bred in Ireland
Racehorses trained in the United Kingdom